Norman Lockhart Smith  (Chinese Translated Name: 史美; 29 May 1887 – 27 January 1968) was a British colonial administrator who served as Acting Administrator of Hong Kong on various occasions.

Smith was born in Ryton, County Durham, England. Smith's father was a businessman and politician Hugh Crawford Smith, who was elected M.P. for Tyneside in 1900. Smith's mother was Hannah Ralston Lockhart. Smith was educated in Sedbergh and attended Queen's College, Oxford. He entered the Hong Kong Civil Service in 1910 and was seconded for military service during the First World War.

In Hong Kong, Smith was appointed principal assistant colonial secretary in 1931, director of education in 1933 and secretary for Chinese affairs in 1934. He served as colonial secretary from 1936 to 1941 and acting governor on several occasions.

In 1962, Smith and Sir Robert Kotewall published translations for The Penguin Book of Chinese Verse.

In 1914, Smith married Maud Violet Banister in Hong Kong. He returned to England after retirement and died in Selham, aged 80.

Honours
 Companion of the Order of St Michael and St George (CMG) (1937)

References

External links

1887 births
1968 deaths
People from Ryton, Tyne and Wear
Alumni of The Queen's College, Oxford
Chief Secretaries of Hong Kong
20th-century British civil servants
British colonial governors and administrators in Asia
Companions of the Order of St Michael and St George